The Scotsman Publications Limited (TSPL) was the holding company of The Scotsman, Scotland on Sunday, Edinburgh Evening News and Herald & Post newspapers, and of the Scotsman.com website.

The company was based in Edinburgh, Scotland.  In December 2005 it was sold by Press Holdings in a £160 million deal to Johnston Press.  Johnston Press entered administration in November 2018. All assets were acquired by JPIMedia.

References

External links 
 Scotsman website

Companies based in Edinburgh
Newspaper companies of Scotland
The Scotsman
David and Frederick Barclay